Kristo Saage (born 2 February 1985) is an Estonian professional basketball player who plays for TLÜ/Kalev of the Korvpalli Meistriliiga. He is a 1.85 m (6 ft 1 in) tall point guard. He also represents the Estonian national basketball team internationally.

Club career

Kristo Saage started his basketball career in hometown BC Rakvere Tarvas (then KK Rakvere) at the age of 17. In 2004 Saage signed a deal with Estonian top team BC Kalev/Cramo. He mainly played as a substitution player, who got about 20 minutes per game. With his 3 years spell with BC Kalev/Cramo he became the Estonian champion twice and the Estonian Basketball Cup winner once.

Saage moved to play basketball for BC Rakvere Tarvas once again, sharing his tenure at the first half of the season with now-defunct BC Fausto Tartu, averaging 13.0 points and 3.8 rebounds in 2006–07 season. The following season he spent in BC Kalev/Cramo as a benchboy, so after a year in Tallinn he rejoined BC Rakvere Tarvas.

After achieving Tarvas's highest place in the KML, Saage had an offer from abroad and on 3 January 2011 it was announced that his career continued in Lithuania with KK Kaunas, where he played until the end of the 2011–12 LKL season. After a successful national team summer he signed a contract with the University of Tartu.

International career

Kristo Saage has represented Estonia since junior levels. He first came to prominence in 2004 when he played vital role beating strong Serbia and Montenegro U20, scoring 17 points and playing all 40 minutes. Since 2011 he has been included to Estonian senior team.

Awards and accomplishments

Professional career

Kalev/Cramo
 Estonian League champion: 2005
 2× Estonian Cup champion: 2005, 2007

University of Tartu
 Estonian Cup champion: 2011

References

External links
 Kristo Saage at basket.ee 
 Kristo Saage at fiba.com

1985 births
Living people
BC Kalev/Cramo players
BC Rakvere Tarvas players
BC Tallinn Kalev players
BC Valga players
Estonian men's basketball players
Estonian expatriate basketball people in Lithuania
Korvpalli Meistriliiga players
LSU-Atletas basketball players
Point guards
Tartu Ülikool/Rock players
Sportspeople from Rakvere